Richard Hudson may refer to:

Richard Hudson (American politician) (born 1971), U.S Representative for North Carolina's 8th congressional district
Richard Hudson (linguist) (born 1939), British linguist
Richard Hudson (musician) (born 1948), British musician
Richard Hudson (New Zealand politician) (1860–1953), Reform Party Member of Parliament in New Zealand
Richard Hudson (sculptor) (born 1954), British sculptor, living in Spain
Richard Hudson (stage designer) (born 1954), Zimbabwean stage designer
Dick Hudson (American football, born 1940) (1940–2016), American football player
Dick Hudson (American football, born 1898), American football player
Richard Hudson (English politician), Member of Parliament (MP) for Lostwithiel (1547–1552)